The Savannah Book Festival is a literary festival held each February in Savannah, Georgia, that features authors and educational events. The Savannah Book Festival has featured best-selling authors Stephen King, James Patterson and David Baldacci, Pulitzer Prize-winners Garry Wills, Geraldine Brooks and Isabel Wilkerson, National Book Award winner Ben Fountain, and Nobel Prize laureate Al Gore.

2014 Festival
The Seventh Annual Savannah Book Festival is Feb. 13-16, 2014 in Telfair Square and at the Trustees Theater in Savannah.

2013 Festival
The Sixth Annual Savannah Book Festival was Feb. 14-17, 2013 in Telfair Square and at the Trustees Theater in Savannah. On Feb. 14, 2013, humorist Dave Barry delivered the welcome address. On Feb. 15, 2013, thriller writer James Patterson delivered the keynote address.  On Feb. 17, 2013, political novelist David Baldacci delivered the closing address.

Other 2013 authors included:
 Nobel Prize winner and former vice president Al Gore
 NBC Today co-host Hoda Kotb
 Diary of a Wimpy Kid series author Jeff Kinney
 Literary novelist T.C. Boyle
 Literary novelist and National Book Award winner Ben Fountain
 Presidential historian Evan Thomas
 Pulitzer Prize-winning historian and religion writer Garry Wills
 Pulitzer Prize-winning journalist and historian Isabel Wilkerson
 Pulitzer Prize-winning journalist and novelist J.R. Moehringer
 CNN anchor and chief Washington correspondent Jake Tapper

2012 Festival
Publishers Weekly, the publishing industry's leading trade magazine, noted that the Savannah Book Festival "is carving a space for itself among the book festival big leagues."

The 2012 author lineup included:
 Best-selling thriller writer Stephen King
 Literary novelist Pat Conroy
 Steve Jobs biographer Walter Isaacson
 Political thriller writer Brad Thor
 James Bond series writer Jeffery Deaver
 Pulitzer Prize-winning literary novelist Geraldine Brooks
 Literary novelist Stewart O'Nan'

2011 Festival
The 2011 author lineup included:
 Political strategist Karl Rove
 Literary novelist Lee Smith
 Literary novelist Karl Marlantes

References

External links
Official site of Savannah Book Festival

Culture of Savannah, Georgia
Literary festivals in the United States